Jason Lewis (born September 29, 1970, in New York, New York), better known by his stage name AMG, is an American rapper.

Career
AMG made his debut appearance in 1991 on the album Quik Is the Name by DJ Quik, on the songs "Deep", "Tear It Off" and "Skanless". His association with DJ Quik helped him secure a record deal with Select Records, who he signed to in 1991. That same year, he released his debut album, Bitch Betta Have My Money, which featured the singles "Jiggable Pie", "Bitch Betta Have My Money", "Vertical Joyride" and "I Wanna Be Yo Ho". AMG produced almost the entire album by himself, with DJ Quik serving as an additional producer on one song. The album was a moderate success commercially, reaching No. 63 on the US Billboard 200.

AMG is known for his sexually explicit lyrics, and most notably for songs like "Bitch Betta Have My Money" and "Jiggable Pie". The British electronica group Hardknox later sampled "Bitch Betta Have My Money" on their single, "Who's Money?", which was originally sampled by AMG from Big Daddy Kane's song "Pimpin' Ain't Easy". Ludacris also borrowed three lines of lyrics for his song "Area Codes".

AMG appeared on porn star-turn-singer Midori's album Miss Judged in 2001. In 2007, AMG began recording an album with DJ Quik under the name "The Fixxers". They released a single through Interscope Records titled "Can U Werk Wit Dat". The album, Midnight Life, was scheduled to be released in mid-to-late 2007 but was shelved due to material being leaked prior to its release.

Discography

Studio albums

Compilation albums
 Greatest Humps Volume One (2002)

Singles

References

External links
The Fixxers sign with Interscope

African-American male rappers
Living people
1970 births
Rappers from Los Angeles
Select Records artists
West Coast hip hop musicians
20th-century American rappers
21st-century American rappers
20th-century American male musicians
21st-century American male musicians
20th-century African-American musicians
21st-century African-American musicians